The Appalachian Regional Development Act of 1965 established the Appalachian Regional Commission (ARC), which was tasked with overseeing economic development programs in the Appalachia region, as well as the construction of the Appalachian Development Highway System. Membership included representatives from New York, Pennsylvania, Ohio, Maryland, West Virginia, Virginia, Kentucky, Tennessee, North Carolina, South Carolina, Georgia, Alabama, and Mississippi, as well as one federal appointee. This Act is one of the longest serving place-based regional development programs in the United States, and is the largest in terms of geographic scope.

History

In the 1960s, one in three Appalachians lived in poverty. Per capita income in the Appalachian region was 23 percent lower than the U.S. average, and high unemployment forced millions to seek work outside the region. John F. Kennedy's interest in the Appalachian region centered around West Virginia, where in 1958, two years before the 1960 presidential primaries began, he had pollster take a sampling of public opinion. In the Spring of 1960, Senator Kennedy and Senator Hubert Humphrey engaged in a campaign fight, which drew attention to the poverty conditions of the state. When Kennedy toured West Virginia, he was moved by the widespread poverty in the state, where nearly every other person was living in poverty in a typical West Virginia county.

In 1963, President John F. Kennedy created the President's Appalachian Regional Commission (PARC) "to prepare a comprehensive action program for the economic development of the Appalachian Region." This work was continued by President Lyndon B. Johnson after Kennedy's assassination. He used a PARC report as a basis for legislation. In 1964, he sent a request to Congress to send special aid to the economically depressed region as part of the War on Poverty. The Senate passed a bill close to the president's request, but the House failed to pass a bill before the 88th Congress adjourned. This meant a new bill needed to be introduced and passed in the Senate when the 89th Congress convened in January 1965.

In 1965, Democratic Senator Jennings Randolph from West Virginia, who was chair of the Subcommittee on Public Roads of the Senate Committee on Public Works, wrote to West Virginia Senator Robert Byrd, requesting support for a bill that would provide aid to the Appalachian region. Because Robert Byrd came from the coal fields of Southern West Virginia, he readily agreed to co-sponsor the bill. On January 6, 1965, Senator Jennings Randolph introduced an administration-backed Appalachian aid bill (S.3) calling for more than $1 billion in federal assistance to the region. The Public Works Committee reported the bill to the Senate on January 27, 1965, and the Senate passed the bill on February 1, 1965, with a vote of 62-22. 

The House of Representatives reported the bill on February 17, 1965, and passed the House with a 257-165 roll call vote on March 3, 1965. President Johnson signed the Appalachian Regional Development Act of 1965 into law on March 9, 1965. The act established the Appalachian Regional Commission (ARC). Its membership included representatives from New York, Pennsylvania, Ohio, Maryland, West Virginia, Virginia, Kentucky, Tennessee, North Carolina, South Carolina, Georgia, Alabama, and Mississippi.

Impact 
In 2010, a study showed that the 1965 Act reduced Appalachian poverty between 1960 and 2000 by 4.2 percentage points relative to border counties, or about 10 percent on the baseline 1960 poverty rate, and real per capita incomes grew about 4 percent faster. A 2019 study found that the construction of the Appalachian Development Highway System led to economic net gains of $54 billion (approximately 0.4 percent of national income) and boosted incomes in the Appalachian region by reducing the costs of trade.

References

External Resources
The Great Society Congress

1965 in law
Great Society programs
89th United States Congress
Appalachia